The 2001 Copa dos Campeões was the second staging of the Brazilian football competition Copa dos Campeões. The competition began on June 26, 2001 and ended on July 11, 2001 with the final, held at the Almeidão in João Pessoa, in which Flamengo lifted the trophy for the first time in their history with an aggregate 7–6 victory over São Paulo. Palmeiras were the defending champions, but they did not qualify for this edition.

Qualifying stage
The qualifying stage was played by Goiás, Sport, and São Raimundo. The three teams played each other once and the best two qualified for the final stage of the competition.

|}
São Raimundo and Sport qualified for the First Stage of the Copa dos Campeões 2001.

First stage

|}

First leg

Second leg

Semi-finals
The first leg matches were played on 30 June while the second legs were played on 4 July 2001.

|}

First leg

Second leg

Final

First leg

Second leg

References
http://www.flamengo.com.br/flapedia/Flamengo_2x3_S%C3%A3o_Paulo_-_Final_da_Copa_dos_Campe%C3%B5es_de_2001

globoesporte.com

2001 in Brazilian football
2001 domestic association football cups